CM Shafi Sami a Bangladeshi diplomat. He was selected as an adviser of the caretaker government of Bangladesh under President Iajuddin Ahmed and resigned after about a month with three other advisers Hasan Mashhud Chowdhury, Akbar Ali Khan and Sultana Kamal, . According to Sheikh Hasina, they failed to discharge their constitutional responsibilities in the name of crackdown on corruption.

Early life
Sami passed his matriculation from Jamalpur Government College and intermediate exam from MC College in Sylhet. He got his bachelor's and master's in physics from the University of Dhaka in 1962 and 1963 respectively. He joined Pakistan Civil Service in 1966. Prior to that he also worked at Pakistan Atomic Energy Commission (PAEC) and East Pakistan University of Engineering and Technology for a while.

Career
Sami was the chief coordinator of the first SAARC summit and was selected the deputy general secretary of the summit. He also worked at the Bangladesh embassy in Cairo and as the Charge-de-affairs in Paris. He also worked in the UNESCO as a residing representative. He served as Bangladesh's High Commissioner to Pakistan from February 1987 to October 1991.

Sami became the Bangladeshi High Commissioner to India in 1995 and remained there till 1999. During this time he played an important part in signing the Ganges Water Distribution Agreement and Chittagong Hill Tracts Peace Accord. After that, he served as the foreign secretary till 2001. During the caretaker government of 2001, he became the chief foreign secretary. Besides he was a member of the International Civil Service Commission of the United Nations. He also led Bangladeshi correspondents in UN, NAM, OIC and other international conferences.

Notes

Living people
People from Sylhet
Bangladeshi diplomats
University of Dhaka alumni
High Commissioners of Bangladesh to India
Advisors of Caretaker Government of Bangladesh
Year of birth missing (living people)
High Commissioners of Bangladesh to Pakistan